These are the Oricon number one albums of 2005, per the Oricon Albums Chart.

Chart history

Trivia
Number-one album of 2005: MusiQ by Orange Range.
Most weeks at number-one: Def Tech with a total of 4 weeks.

External links
https://web.archive.org/web/20141021000023/http://www.geocities.jp/object_ori/indexa.html

See also
2005 in music

Japan Albums
Lists of number-one albums in Japan
2005 in Japanese music